Morelos Municipality may refer to:

 Morelos Municipality, Coahuila
 Morelos Municipality, Chihuahua
 Morelos, Michoacán
 Morelos, State of Mexico
 Morelos, Zacatecas

See also
 
 Morelos (disambiguation)

Municipality name disambiguation pages